The 1882 Carmarthen by-election was a parliamentary by-election held for the House of Commons constituency of Carmarthen Boroughs in West Wales on 4 January 1882.

Vacancy
The by-election was caused by the appointment of the sitting Liberal MP, Benjamin Thomas Williams as a county court judge. Williams had himself been elected as MP for Carmarthen at a by-election in 1878.

Candidates
The Liberals selected John Jones Jenkins, an Alderman and magistrate from Swansea, where he had been mayor three times.

The result
There being no other candidates putting themselves forward Jenkins was elected unopposed.

Results

See also
Lists of United Kingdom by-elections 
United Kingdom by-election records

References

Unopposed by-elections to the Parliament of the United Kingdom in Welsh constituencies
1882 in Wales
1880s elections in Wales
Elections in Carmarthenshire
1882 elections in the United Kingdom
19th century in Carmarthenshire
January 1882 events